FK 14 Oktobar is a Serbian football club based in Kruševac, Serbia.

Notable players
 Marko Đorđević

14 Oktobar